Kotta Alludu is a 1979 Indian Telugu-language film that stars Krishna, Jaya Prada, Chiranjeevi, Hema Chaudhary and Mohan Babu.

Plot

Cast  
 Krishna as Hari
 Jaya Prada as Leela
 Gummadi_(actor)
 Chiranjeevi
 Hema Chaudhary
 Raja Babu
 Mohan Babu

Production 
 Satya Chitra Productions

Soundtrack 
 Pillakadu Kadamma – S.P. Balasubrahmanyam, P. Susheela
 Demudu Varame Ichadu –
 Adigadigo Aa Navve – S.P. Balasubrahmanyam
 Rupayee Rupayee –
 Ekkada Vunnaru Srivaru –
 Hari Hari Srikrishna –

Critical reception

References

External links
 

1979 films
Films scored by K. V. Mahadevan
1970s Telugu-language films